The R715 is a Regional Route in Free State, South Africa that connects Springfontein with Bethulie.

Route
Its north-western terminus is the N1 at Springfontein, south of the town centre. From Springfontein, it runs south-east, to Bethulie, where it ends at a junction with the R701.

References 

Regional Routes in the Free State (province)